Li Xian (born 19 October 1991) is a Chinese actor. He has starred in many commercial films, variety shows and music videos.

Commercial film

Variety Show

Music video

References

Videographies